The 1910–11 season was Manchester City F.C.'s 20th season of league football and 1st season back in the First Division of English football following their promotion at the first attempt in the previous season.

Letter

Team Kit

Football League First Division

Results summary

Reports

FA Cup

Squad statistics

Squad
Appearances for competitive matches only

Scorers

All

League

FA Cup

See also
Manchester City F.C. seasons

References

External links
Extensive Manchester City statistics site

Manchester City F.C. seasons
Manchester City F.C.